Vatsavai mandal is one of the 20 mandals in the NTR district of the Indian state of Andhra Pradesh.

List of Villages
The following villages are in the Andhra Pradesh state:

Allurupadu
Bhimavaram
China Modugapalle
Chittela
Dabbakupalle
Dechupalem
Gangavalli
Gopinenipalem
Indugapalle
Kakaravai
Kambampadu
Kanneveedu
Lingala
Machinenipalem
Makkapeta
Mangollu
Peda Modugapalle
Pochavaram
Polampalle
Talluru
Vatsavai
Vemavaram
Vemulanarva

References 

Mandals in NTR district